In the Indian state of Bihar, on June 6, 1981, a passenger train carrying more than 800 passengers between Mansi (Dhamara Pul) and Saharsa, India derailed and plunged into the river Bagmati while it was crossing a bridge.

After five days, more than 200 bodies were recovered, with hundreds more missing that were feared washed away by the river. Estimates of total deaths range from 500 to 800 or more. By the afternoon of June 12, the government had completed its recovery efforts and had issued an official death toll of 235 passengers (including the bodies of 3 passengers which had not been recovered), with 88 survivors.

The accident is among the deadliest-ever rail accidents in India on record.

Cause 
The cause of the accident is uncertain as the accident was not well documented. There are multiple theories:

 a cyclone
 flash flooding 
 brake failure

See also
 Lists of rail accidents

References

External links  
 Encyclopædia Britannica: Bihar train disaster

Derailments in India
Railway accidents in 1981
1981 in India
Disasters in Bihar
History of Bihar (1947–present)
June 1981 events in Asia
Railway accidents and incidents in Bihar